Kevin Wahr (born 24 March 1989 in Nagold) is a German motorcycle racer, in 2017 he will ride a Yamaha YZF-R6 in the IDM Superstock 600 Championship. He was the IDM Supersport champion in 2013. He previously competed in the Supersport World Championship.

Career statistics

Supersport World Championship

Races by year
(key)

Grand Prix motorcycle racing

By season

Races by year
(key)

References

External links

1989 births
Living people
German motorcycle racers
Moto2 World Championship riders
Supersport World Championship riders